Brandon Varney is an American professional stock car racing driver. He competes part-time in the ARCA Menards Series East, driving the No. 44 Ford Fusion for Ferrier-McClure Racing.

Racing career

ARCA Menards Series
Varney made his ARCA Menards Series debut in 2021. He debuted in the Calypso Lemonade 200 at Winchester Speedway, finishing 6th. He ran one more race, the Henry Ford Health System 200 at Michigan International Speedway, finishing 10th.

ARCA Menards Series East 
Varney made his ARCA Menards Series East debut in 2022 at Five Flags Speedway in the Pensacola 200. Similarly to his ARCA Menards Series debut, Varney finished 6th.

Motorsports career results

ARCA Menards Series
(key) (Bold – Pole position awarded by qualifying time. Italics – Pole position earned by points standings or practice time. * – Most laps led.)

ARCA Menards Series East

References

External links
 

Living people
ARCA Menards Series drivers
NASCAR drivers
Racing drivers from Michigan
1997 births
People from Richmond, Michigan